The 2013 Big East men's soccer tournament was the inaugural men's soccer tournament of the new Big East Conference, formed in July 2013 after the original Big East Conference split into two leagues along football lines. Including the history of the original conference, it was the 18th edition of the Big East tournament.

Held from November 15–17 at PPL Park in Chester, Pennsylvania, it determined the Big East Conference champion, and the automatic berth into the 2013 NCAA Division I Men's Soccer Championship. The defending champions, the Notre Dame Fighting Irish, left the original Big East at the time of the conference split to join the Atlantic Coast Conference. The tournament was won by the Marquette Golden Eagles who defeated the Providence Friars in the Big East final.

Bracket

Schedule

First round

Semifinals

Big East Championship

Statistical leaders

See also 
 Atlantic 10 Conference
 2013 Atlantic 10 Conference men's soccer season
 2013 NCAA Division I men's soccer season
 2013 NCAA Division I Men's Soccer Championship

References 

2013